Erdal Saygın (1931–2007) was a Turkish educator and university administrator who served for six years (1992–1998) as the rector of the İzmir Institute of Technology. He was the first academic in the institution's top position upon its founding in 1992.

References 

Turkish educators
İzmir Institute of Technology
People from İzmir
Place of birth missing
1931 births
2007 deaths
Rectors of İzmir Institute of Technology